Mohammadqoli Qeshlaq (also Romanized as Moḩammadqolī Qeshlāq; also known as Moḩammad ‘Alī Qeshlāqī) is a village in Ajorluy-ye Sharqi Rural District of Nokhtalu District of Baruq County, West Azerbaijan province, Iran. At the 2006 National Census, its population was 444 in 77 households, when it was in the former Baruq District of Miandoab County. The following census in 2011 counted 339 people in 84 households. The latest census in 2016 showed a population of 366 people in 93 households; it was the largest village in its rural district. After the census, Baruq District was separated from Miandoab County, elevated to the status of a county, and divided into two districts: the Central and Nokhtalu Districts.

References 

Populated places in West Azerbaijan Province